Mazraeh-ye Jonubi Rural District is a rural district (dehestan) in Voshmgir District, Aqqala County, Golestan Province, Iran. At the 2006 census, its population was 5,891 in 1,287 families.  The rural district has 6 villages.

References 

Rural Districts of Golestan Province
Aqqala County